is an exhibition institution in Ground Self-Defense Force Narashino Camp.

It is one of the famous places in Funabashi.

References

External links 
  No.13 Kūtei-kan, "Modern building survey report of Chiba prefecture", Chiba Prefectural Board of Education, March 31, 1993. It published on Web by Chiba Museum of Science and Industry.

Japan Ground Self-Defense Force
Funabashi